Robyn Davies-Patrick is a former association football player who represented New Zealand at international level.

Davies-Patrick made her Football Ferns début in a 0–1 loss to Bulgaria on 24 August 1994, and finished her international career with four caps to her credit.

Robyn played for Arsenal Ladies between 1996–1997.

References

Year of birth missing (living people)
Living people
New Zealand women's international footballers
New Zealand women's association footballers
Women's association footballers not categorized by position